Imperator Aleksandr III was one of five s built for the Russian Imperial Navy in the first decade of the 20th century. The ship was completed a few months before the start of the Russo-Japanese War in February 1904 and was assigned to the Second Pacific Squadron that was sent to the Far East six months later to break the Japanese blockade of Port Arthur. The Japanese captured the port while the squadron was in transit and their destination was changed to Vladivostok. During the Battle of Tsushima in May 1905, Imperator Alexander III was sunk by Japanese gunfire with the loss of 778 men, her entire crew.

Design and description

The Borodino-class ships were based on the design of the French-built , modified to suit Russian equipment and building practices. They were built under the 1898 program "for the needs of the Far East" of concentrating ten battleships in the Pacific. Designed to displace , she was over  overweight and actually displaced . This caused a problem during sea trials on 6 October 1903 when she made a high-speed turn that caused her to heel 15° and flooded the embrasures for the  guns. Her intended crew consisted of 28 officers and 754 enlisted men, although she carried 826–846 crewmen in service.

The ship was powered by a pair of four-cylinder vertical triple-expansion steam engines, each driving one propeller shaft, using steam generated by 20 Belleville boilers.

The ship's main battery consisted of four  guns mounted in two twin-gun turrets, one forward and one aft of the superstructure. The secondary armament consisted of 12 Canet  quick-firing (QF) guns, mounted in twin-gun turrets. A number of smaller guns were carried for defence against torpedo boats. These included twenty 75-millimeter QF guns and twenty  Hotchkiss guns. She was also armed with four  torpedo tubes, one each at the bow and stern above water and two submerged. The  armored lower deck curved downwards and formed an anti-torpedo bulkhead.

Service
Construction began on Imperator Aleksandr III, named after Tsar Alexander III, on 5 September 1899 at the Baltic Works in Saint Petersburg. The ship was laid down on 23 May 1900 and launched on 3 August 1901. In August 1902 she was in Reval for the visit of the German Kaiser, Wilhelm II, and took part in combined fleet maneuvers with ships from the German navy. She was completed in November 1903 at the cost of 13,979,000 rubles.

On 15 October 1904, Imperator Alexandr III set sail for Port Arthur from Libau along with the other vessels of the Second Pacific Squadron, under the overall command of Vice Admiral Zinovy Rozhestvensky. Rozhestvensky led his squadron, including Imperator Alexandr III, down the Atlantic coast of Africa, rounding Cape of Good Hope, and reached the island of Nosy Be off the north-west coast of Madagascar on 9 January 1905 where they remained for two months while Rozhestvensky finalized his coaling arrangements. The squadron sailed for Camranh Bay, French Indochina, on 16 March and reached it almost a month later to await the obsolete ships of the 3rd Pacific Squadron, commanded by Rear Admiral Nikolai Nebogatov. The latter ships reached Camranh Bay on 9 May and the combined force sailed for Vladivostok on 14 May. While exact figures are not available for Imperator Aleksandr III, it is probable that the ship was approximately  overweight as she and her sisters were overloaded with coal and other supplies; all of which was stored high in the ships and reduced their stability.

Rozhestvensky decided to take the most direct route to Vladivostok using the Tsushima Strait and was intercepted by the Japanese battlefleet under the command of Vice Admiral Tōgō Heihachirō on 27 May 1905. At the beginning of the battle, Imperator Alexandr III was second in line behind Rozhestvensky's flagship, . Very little is known of the ship's actions during the battle as there were no survivors from the ship and visibility was poor for most of the battle, but Captain W. C. Pakenham; the Royal Navy's official military observer under the Anglo-Japanese Alliance, noted that she was set on fire early in the engagement. She did initially follow Knyaz Suvorov when that ship's steering was damaged about a half-hour after the Japanese opened fire at 14:10 but turned north when her captain, Nikolai Bukhvostov, realized that Knyaz Suvorov was out of control. Tōgō tried to concentrate his fire on the crippled Knyaz Suvorov around 16:00, but Bukhvostov turned Imperator Alexandr III straight for the Japanese battleline in a successful attempt to focus their attention on his ship. He was successful, but she was badly damaged in the process. Observers noted that her bow was badly damaged and that there was a large hole in the forward hull on the port side. When the shooting resumed around 18:00, the Japanese concentrated their fire upon the ship and her sister, . Imperator Alexandr III sheered out of line to port around 18:30 and capsized, but did not sink until 19:07; there were no survivors.

Memory
In 1908, a granite obelisk, designed by Artem Ober and Yakov Filote, was constructed in the surrounding gardens of St. Nicholas Naval Cathedral, Saint Petersburg, to remember the men of the Imperator Aleksandr III.

Notes

Footnotes

References

Further reading

Borodino-class battleships
Battleships of Russia
1901 ships
Ships built at the Baltic Shipyard
Russo-Japanese War battleships of Russia
Shipwrecks in the Tsushima Strait
Shipwrecks of the Russo-Japanese War
Ships lost with all hands
Maritime incidents in 1905